Boothferry was a constituency in Humberside which returned one Member of Parliament (MP)  to the House of Commons of the Parliament of the United Kingdom. It was created for the 1983 general election, and abolished for the 1997 general election.

History
This was a safe Conservative seat for the fourteen years of its existence.

Boundaries
The Borough of Boothferry, the Borough of East Yorkshire wards of Battleburn, Garrowby, Market Weighton, Pocklington, Stamford Bridge, Vale, Wilberfoss, Wold, and Woodland, and the East Yorkshire Borough of Beverley wards of Cherry Holme, Skidby and Rowley, South Cave, and Walkington.

Named after the Humberside district of Boothferry, this constituency included areas which before local government reorganisation in 1974 had been in the West Riding of Yorkshire (Goole), the East Riding of Yorkshire (Howden) and Lincolnshire, Parts of Lindsey (Epworth and the Isle of Axholme). Apart from Goole itself, the constituency was largely rural.

As Humberside was awarded an extra seat in the boundary review implemented in 1997, the constituency was split into four, Brigg and Goole, East Yorkshire, Haltemprice and Howden and Beverley and Holderness being the destinations of the constituents in descending order.

Members of Parliament

Elections

Elections in the 1980s

Elections in the 1990s

See also
List of parliamentary constituencies in Humberside

Notes and references

Parliamentary constituencies in Yorkshire and the Humber (historic)